The 2018 Monte-Carlo Masters (also known as the Rolex Monte-Carlo Masters for sponsorship reasons) was a tennis tournament for male professional players that was played on outdoor clay courts. It was the 112th edition of the annual Monte Carlo Masters tournament, sponsored by Rolex for the tenth time. It took place at the Monte Carlo Country Club in Roquebrune-Cap-Martin, France (though billed as Monte Carlo, Monaco).

Points
Because the Monte Carlo Masters is the non-mandatory Masters 1000 event, special rules regarding points distribution are in place. The Monte Carlo Masters counts as one of a player's 500 level tournaments, while distributing Masters 1000 points.

Singles main draw entrants

Seeds

Rankings are as of April 9, 2018.

Other entrants
The following players received wildcards into the main draw:
  Félix Auger-Aliassime
  Lucas Catarina
  Thanasi Kokkinakis 
  Gilles Simon 

The following players received entry via the qualifying draw:
  Marco Cecchinato
  Jérémy Chardy
  Pierre-Hugues Herbert
  Ilya Ivashka
  Dušan Lajović
  Andreas Seppi
  Stefanos Tsitsipas

The following players received entry as lucky losers:
  Mirza Bašić
  Florian Mayer
  Guillermo García López

Withdrawals
Before the tournament
  Pablo Carreño Busta → replaced by  Guillermo García López
  Aleksandr Dolgopolov → replaced by  Mirza Bašić
  David Ferrer → replaced by  Guido Pella
   Filip Krajinović → replaced by  Florian Mayer
  Leonardo Mayer → replaced by  Márton Fucsovics
  Gaël Monfils → replaced by  Julien Benneteau
  Jo-Wilfried Tsonga → replaced by  Tennys Sandgren

During the tournament
  Milos Raonic

Doubles main draw entrants

Seeds

 Rankings are as of April 9, 2018.

Other entrants
The following pairs received wildcards into the doubles main draw:
  Romain Arneodo /  Hugo Nys 
  Simone Bolelli /  Fabio Fognini

The following pairs received entry as alternates:
  James Cerretani /  Andreas Seppi
  Damir Džumhur /  Aisam-ul-Haq Qureshi

Withdrawals
Before the tournament
  Filip Krajinović
  Milos Raonic
  Horia Tecău
  Fernando Verdasco

During the tournament
  Grigor Dimitrov

Champions

Singles

  Rafael Nadal def.  Kei Nishikori, 6–3, 6–2

Doubles

  Bob Bryan /  Mike Bryan def.  Oliver Marach /  Mate Pavić, 7–6(7–5), 6–3.

References

External links
 
 Association of Tennis Professionals (ATP) tournament profile